Over the Hill may refer to:

Film and television
 Over the Hill (1917 film), an American silent drama film
 Over the Hill to the Poorhouse or Over the Hill, a 1920 American silent film
 Over the Hill (1931 film), an American drama film
 Over the Hill (1992 film), an Australian film
 Over the Hill (TV series), a 1994–1995 Australian television series on the Seven Network
 “Over the Hill”, an episode of the 20th series of the UK/US children’s tv series Thomas & Friends

Other uses
 Over the Hills, a 2007 album by Lucy Kaplansky
 "Over the Hill", a 1973 song by John Martyn from Solid Air
 "Over the hill", the route over the Patchen Pass between Santa Cruz and the Santa Clara Valley, California

See also
 Over the Hills and Far Away (disambiguation)